No entren al 1408: Antología en español tributo a Stephen King (English: Do Not Enter Room 1408: A Spanish Anthology Tribute to Stephen King) is a collection of horror stories by 22 Spanish-language authors, which aims to pay tribute to the style of the horror master Stephen King. The book was edited by the Ecuadorian writer Jorge Luis Cáceres. These books entitled “No entren al 1408” (Don’t enter the 1408) and “King, tributo al rey del terror” (King, tribute to the king of terror, InterZona, Buenos Aires, 2015), have three editions: Ecuador, 2013; Mexico, 2014 and Argentina, 2015, and are written by 30 writers from: Chile, Cuba, Ecuador, Mexico, Argentina, Uruguay and Spain.

Authors
 Jorge Luis Cáceres (Quito, 1982)
 Mariana Enríquez (Buenos Aires, 1973)
 Juan Terranova (Buenos Aires, 1975)
 Luciano Lamberti (Córdoba, 1978) (Only in Ecuador and México)
 Jorge Enrique Lage (Havana, 1979)
 Francisco Ortega (Victoria, 1974)
 Abdón Ubidia (Quito, 1944) (Only in Ecuador and México)
 Eduardo Varas (Guayaquil, 1979) (Only in Ecuador and México)
 Patricia Esteban Erlés (Zaragoza, 1972)
 David Roas (Barcelona, 1965)
 Santiago Eximeno (Madrid, 1973) (Only in Ecuador and México)
 Paula Lapido (Madrid, 1975) (Only in Ecuador and México)
 Sergi Bellver (Barcelona, 1971) (Only in Ecuador and México)
 Juan Soto Ivars (Águilas, 1985)(Only in Ecuador and México)
 Marina Perezagua (Sevilla, 1978) 
 Alberto Chimal (Toluca, 1970)
 Cecilia Eudave (Guadalajara, 1968) (Only in Ecuador and México)
 Antonio Ortuño (Guadalajara, 1976)
 Gabriel Rimachi Sialer (Lima, 1974) (Only in Ecuador)
 Carlos Calderón Fajardo (Juliaca, 1946) (Only in Ecuador)
 Rodolfo Santullo (Uruguay-México, 1979) (Only in Ecuador and México)
 Javier Calvo (Barcelona, 1973)
 Carlos Yushimito (Lima, 1977) (Only in México)
 Alexis Iparraguirre (Lima, 1974) 
 Santiago Roncagliolo (Lima, 1975) (Only in Argentina)
 Edmundo Paz Soldán (Cochabamba, 1967) (Only in Argentina)
 Nico Saraintaris (Argentina, 1983) (Only in Argentina)
 Ariel Idez (Buenos Aires, 1977) (Only in Argentina)
 Espido Freire (Bilbao, 1974) (Only in Argentina)
 Solange Rodríguez Pappe (Guayaquil, 1976) (Only in Ecuador)

Reception 

The influence of the masters of pop culture in Spanish American narrative is a yet unexplored territory. In this anthology, various young authors from different latitudes come together under the influence of Stephen King and pay tribute to the “master of horror”. These stories prove that supernatural horror is not a tradition alien to Spanish American literature but is an interest of a generation of writers. The ghost of King looms over these stories, sometimes like Pennywise, others like an arcane being from the beyond where reality shows coexist with zombies. Inspired by the North American writer, the stories gate crash meetings of psychiatric patients, discover supernatural beings infiltrating Latin American military movements, narrate spontaneous experiments in quantum physics and present obscure characters, such as evil doppelgangers or demons that stalk innocent children. Welcome, reader, to this disturbing homage: here there is cannibalism, madness and religious sects. Here there are tigers.

References 

Spanish horror fiction
Stephen King